Northern Dimension Environmental Partnership (NDEP) tackles special issues arising from the northern environment: protection of waters (the Baltic Sea and the Barents Sea) and nuclear safety and such special issues as waste management and district heating projects. The NDEP was established in 2001. It seeks to strengthen funding and to channel it to important cross-border environmental projects in the Northern Dimension region.

The NDEP Support Fund was set up on the initiative of International Financial Institutions to support the partnership; contributors to the Fund are the European Commission, Belgium, Canada, Denmark, Finland, France, Germany, Netherlands, Norway, Russia, Sweden and the United Kingdom. Donor contributions to the NDEP Support Fund by 2013 totalled EUR 342 million, of which EUR 177 million had been allocated to environmental projects and EUR 165 million to nuclear safety projects.

The NDEP Support Fund is financing environmental and energy-efficiency projects in North-West Russia and Kaliningrad and nuclear waste projects especially in the Kola Peninsula. The most concrete example of the environmental projects is the construction of the St Petersburg Wastewater Treatment Plants, which mean that 98.4% of the wastewater discharges into the Gulf of Finland will be treated. Cooperation is active also with Belarus, which is one of the countries in the Baltic Sea catchment area. In the nuclear safety sector, projects include treatment of radioactive waste and safe storage of spent nuclear fuel.

Contributors to the NDEP are IFIs operating in the region, such as the European Bank for Reconstruction and Development (EBRD), the European Investment Bank (EIB) and the Nordic Investment Bank (NIB) and the Nordic Environment Finance Corporation (NEFCO).

External links 
 Home page of NDEP

Northern Dimension